A disability-rights activist or disability-rights advocate is someone who works towards the equality of people with disabilities. Such a person is generally considered a member of the disability-rights movement and/or the independent-living movement.

A

 Javed Abidi – Director of the National Centre for Promotion of Employment for Disabled People (NCPEDP) in India
 Noor Al Mazroei - chef and disability rights activist from Qatar.
 Hiljmnijeta Apuk – founding director of the Little People of Kosovo
 Fatima al-Aqel – opened a school for blind women in Yemen in 1995.
 Ola Abu Alghaib – disability activist from Palestine, focusses on inclusion, gender and disability rights.

B

 Mel Baggs – autism rights activist and blogger
 Safiya al Bahlani – Omani artist, graphic designer, disability rights activist, and motivational speaker
 Jamala al-Baidhani – created the Al-Tahadi Association for Disabled Females, the first group in Yemen devoted to helping girls with disabilities 
 Julia Bascom – autism rights activist and Executive Director of the Autistic Self-Advocacy Network
 Andrew Batavia – ADA regulations drafter, co-founder AUTONOMY, Inc.
 Giselle Bellas – Cuban-American singer-songwriter Alzheimer's disease and Alzheimer's dementia advocate. She collaborates with various Alzheimer's awareness organizations, and in honor of her grandmother who died due to the disease, released a song about her.
 Sister Sponsa Beltran – worked with children and people with disabilities in Liberia.
 Dana Bolles - spaceflight engineer and advocate for those with disabilities in STEM.
 Tiffany Brar founder of Jyothirgamaya Foundation, a not for profit NGO for visually impaired
 Gabriela Brimmer – had cerebral palsy; life chronicled in the American-Mexican drama film Gaby: A True Story (1987), directed by Luis Mandoki
 Marca Bristo – cofounded the (American) National Council on Independent Living (NCIL) with Max Starkloff and Charlie Carr
 Lydia Brown – autism advocate and writer
 Sheletta Brundidge - children's author and autism advocate

C

 Jane Campbell, Baroness Campbell of Surbiton – commissioner of the British Disability Rights Commission 
 Charlie Carr – cofounder of National Council on Independent Living, Boston Center for Independent Living and founder and CEO of The Northeast Independent Living Program in Lawrence, Massachusetts; went on to become Commissioner of the Massachusetts Rehabilitation Commission under Governor Deval Patrick
 Liz Carr – British actress, comedian, broadcaster and international disability rights activist
 Bob Casey, Jr. – United States Senator from Pennsylvania, widely recognized as a leading advocate for people with disabilities expansion of Medicaid home and community-based services.
 Mama Cax – American-Haitian model and disabled rights activist
 Judi Chamberlin – American activist, leader, organizer, public speaker and educator in the psychiatric survivors movement; her political activism followed her involuntary confinement in a psychiatric facility in the 1960s the author of On Our Own: Patient-Controlled Alternatives to the Mental Health System, which is a foundational text in the Mad Pride movement
 James I. Charlton – activist and author of Nothing About Us Without Us
 María Soledad Cisternas – Chilean disability rights activist, member of the committee that drafted the Convention on the Rights of Persons with Disabilities and served as the chairperson on the Committee on the Rights of Persons with Disabilities; in 2017, was appointed the Special Envoy on Disability and Accessibility for the United Nations
 Claudia Cockburn – British activist for transportation accessibility
 Tony Coelho – former congressman from California, primary author and U.S. House sponsor of the Americans with Disabilities Act
 Rebecca Cokley – Executive Director of the National Council on Disability
 Cäsar Jacobson – Norwegian-Canadian. Bilaterally Deaf activist & United Nations Youth Champion, this person is a registered Health Care Worker focusing on Equality & Disability Rights Activism
 Kitty Cone – disability rights activist and staff member of the Disability Rights Education and Defense Fund
 Lois Curtis – American activist and the lead plaintiff in a U.S. Supreme Court case about unjustified segregation of people with disabilities in healthcare institutions

D

 Paul Darke – British academic and international disability rights activist
 Justin Whitlock Dart Jr. – co-founder of the American Association of People with Disabilities
 Nyle DiMarco – activist and spokesperson for LEAD-K, 'Language Equality and Acquisition for Deaf Kids' campaign for American Sign Language and English in education setting
 D. P. Sharma – Indian disability rights activist working for equal opportunity in education, tech enabled education access, and transformation in education and employment policies
 Rich Donovan – economist and founder of the Return On Disability Index
 Theresa Ducharme – founder of the disabled-rights advocacy group People in Equal Participation Inc. in 1981; the organization's chair for many years thereafter
 April Dunn – helped pass Act 833 in Louisiana which helped provide alternatives to graduation for students who cannot pass the standardized tests

E

 Anne Emerman - director of the New York City Mayor's Office for Disabilities (MOPD) during the administration of David Dinkins.
 Dominick Evans – filmmaker, activist, founder of #FilmDis. Media & Entertainment advocate for Center for Disability Rights in New York.
 Edward Evans – Chairman of the UK Ministry of Health Health Advisory Committee on Handicapped Persons from 1949 to 1960

F

 Fred Fay – American advocate for disabled persons.
 Chai Feldblum – lead attorney on legal team that drafted the Americans with Disabilities Act of 1990.
 Julie Fernandez – actress with osteogenesis imperfecta; founded The Disability Foundation; active on presentation of disabled people.
 Catherine Frazee – co-director of Ryerson University's Institute for Disability Studies Research and Education
 Lex Frieden – Chairman of the National Council on Disability from 2002 to 2006; key developer of the Americans with Disabilities Act.
 Judy Fryd – founded group in 1946 for parents of children with a learning disability; the group later became Mencap
 Vic Finkelstein – South African born activist and academic, pioneer of the social model of disability

G

 Haben Girma – first deafblind graduate of Harvard Law School
 Marilyn Golden – disability transportation activist
 Miro Griffiths – disabled academic and activist
 Chen Guangcheng – Chinese civil rights activist

H

 Laura Hershey – protested MDA Labor Day Telethon; a feminist born with a form of muscular dystrophy
 Judith Heumann – wheelchair user who co-founded the World Institute on Disability; served as its co-director from 1983 to 1993; became the Special Advisor for International Disability Rights at the U.S. Department of State
 Rick Hansen – former Canadian Paralympian; raised $20 million for spinal cord research, rehabilitation and wheelchair sports by travelling by wheelchair through 34 countries

I

 Tonya Ingram, – brought awareness through her writing to subjects such as chronic illness, organ donation, Lupus, kidney failure, the COVID-19 pandemic's impact on disabled people, mental illness, suicide, depression, and disability rights. 
 Davina Ingrams, 18th Baroness Darcy de Knayth – British Paralympian and Representative peer
 Malvika Iyer – bilateral amputee, a disability rights activist, and a member of United Nations IANYD's Working Group

J

 Casar Jacobson – autism, disability, and gender equality rights activist, and a UN Women Youth Champion; Former Miss Canada (2013). Bilaterally Deaf and uses American Sign Language
 Harriet McBryde Johnson – a New Mobility "Person of the Year"; a disability-rights attorney and anti-euthanasia activist
 I. King Jordan – first deaf president of Gallaudet University

K

 Helen Keller – American deaf-blind political activist, writer, and lecturer
 John D. Kemp – American disability-rights activist; President and CEO of Viscardi center and the Henry Viscardi School
 Cara Elizabeth Yar Khan – Disability advocate, public speaker and United Nations humanitarian
 Abha Khetarpal - Indian disability-rights activist, founder of Cross The Hurdles, the first-ever counselling/educational resource website and mobile application designed exclusively for people with disabilities.
 Lizzie Kiama - Kenyan founder of This-Ability Trust
 Bonnie Sherr Klein – directed the documentary film Shameless: The ART of Disability (2006)

L

 Frank Larkin – activist who, inspired by the frustrations of living with spina bifida, sought to improve the lives of others with the condition; attended the European Parliament and other continental-level events
 Paul K. Longmore – American history professor and activist who was instrumental in the establishment of disability studies as an academic discipline, and in changes to Social Security that granted people with disabilities more rights
 Carrie Ann Lucas – disability rights attorney

M

 Neil Marcus - actor and playwright active in the development of disability culture 
 Robert Martin – activist for independent living for disabled people
 Ron McCallum – member of Committee on the Rights of Persons with Disabilities; has been on the National People with Disabilities and Carers Council; Chair of Radio for the Print Handicapped of New South Wales Co-operative Ltd.; the first totally blind person to have been appointed to a full professorship at an Australian university
 Anne McDonald – activist for independent living for disabled people
 Kathryn McGee – American activist who founded the National Association for Down Syndrome and the National Down Syndrome Congress; her daughter Tricia had Down syndrome
 Eva Middleton – Belizean advocate for disability rights and involved with the Belize Assembly for Persons with Diverse Abilities (BAPDA)
 Stacey Milbern – American activist who helped establish the disability justice movement
 Paul Steven Miller – American civil rights lawyer, activist and law professor, was a Commissioner of the US Equal Employment Opportunity Commission and author of the Genetic Information Nondiscrimination Act
 Jennifer Laszlo Mizrahi – The co-founder/director of the Mizrahi Family Charitable Fund. She also currently serves as president of RespectAbility, a nonprofit fighting stigmas and advancing opportunities for people with disabilities
 Leroy F. Moore Jr. – African American writer, poet, community activist, feminist, and the founder of Krip-Hop
 Alf Morris – introduced the Chronically Sick and Disabled Persons Act and first "Minister for the Disabled" in Great Britain or anywhere else

N

 Karen Nakamura – American academic, author, filmmaker, photographer and the Robert and Colleen Haas Distinguished Chair of Disability Studies and Professor of Anthropology at University of California, Berkeley
 Sainimili Naivalu - Fijian table tennis medallist and activist
 Neema Namadamu – women's rights and disability rights activist in the Democratic Republic of the Congo (DRC)
 Ari Ne'eman – co-creator of the Autistic Self Advocacy Network
 Yetnebersh Nigussie – blind lawyer and disability rights and anti-AIDS activist from Ethiopia; founded the Ethiopian Center for Disability and Development (ECDD)

O

 Corbett O'Toole – disability rights activist and author in Berkeley, California; established the National Disabled Women's Educational Equity Project
 Mary Jane Owen – disability rights activist, philosopher, policy expert and writer who has lived and worked in Washington, D.C. since 1979

P

 Jean-Christophe Parisot – founder of Collectif des Démocrates Handicapés
 Ajith C. S. Perera – Chief Executive Idiriya in Sri Lanka activist in favour of the social model of disability and Inclusive Society
 Richard Pimentel – activist for workplace rights for disabled people
 Victor Pineda – American activist, participated as government delegate in the drafting of the Convention on the Rights of Persons with Disabilities

R

 Alan Reich – founder of the National Organization on Disability
 Maria Verónica Reina (1960s–2017) – Argentine educational psychologist and disability rights activist
 Gilberto Rincón Gallardo – Mexican politician with shortened arms who worked on disability issues
 Edward Roberts – first quadriplegic to attend the University of California, Berkeley; his fight for access at Berkeley spread into seeking access in the community and the development of the first Centre for Independent Living
 John Elder Robison – autism rights activist and author
 Jay Ruderman – President of the Ruderman Family Foundation, advocating for the rights of people with disabilities in the United States and in Israel

S

 Ali Saberi – member of the City Council of Tehran and one of the highest-paid lawyers in Iran with a fee around $1.7 million
 Peggy S. Salters – first survivor of electroshock treatment in the United States to win a jury verdict and a large money judgment ($635,177) in compensation for extensive permanent amnesia and cognitive disability caused by the procedure
 Sandra Schnur – director of the New York City Half-fare Program for the Handicapped; wrote an early guide for disabled in the city; had quadriplegia
Judy Castle Scott - blind advocate and activist in the field of vision loss
 Annie Segarra – American YouTuber and intersectional activist
 Nabil Shaban – Jordanian-British actor, journalist, and founder of The Graeae, a theater group which promotes disabled performers
 Jim Sinclair – Coordinator and founder of Autism Network International, advisor to Syracuse University's Disability Cultural Center
 Eunice Kennedy Shriver – lifelong advocate for people with intellectual disabilities who founded Special Olympics International in 1968
 Satendra Singh – doctor with disability and founder of Enabling Unit
 Max Starkloff (1937–2010) – founded Paraquad, one of the first independent living centers in the United States; advocated for the Americans with Disabilities Act in 1990
 John Franklin Stephens – actor, athlete, and activist with Down syndrome
 Simon Stevens – disability issues consultant known for his high-profile work around disability issues in the UK

T

 Joni Ericson Tada – evangelical Christian author, radio host, and founder of Joni and Friends, an organization "accelerating Christian ministry in the disability community."
 Sunaura Taylor – artist, writer, and activist
Jack Thorne – English screenwriter and playwright

U

 Chris Underhill – a founder of Thrive and ADD International (Action on Disability and Development)

V

 Susanna van Tonder – Luxembourgish disability-rights activist, patient advocate and blogger with multiple sclerosis
 Lizzie Velásquez – author and public speaker on themes of self-esteem and bullying of young people with disabilities
 Henry Viscardi Jr. – American disability-rights activist who was also advisor to eight US presidents on disability matters

W

 Yuval Wagner – President of Access Israel
 Ron Whyte – playwright who was on the President's Committee for the Employment of the Handicapped
 Alice Wong – founded the Disability Visibility Project
 Grace Woodhead – care in the community in 1890 in the UK
 Patrisha Wright – known as "the General" for her work in coordinating the campaign to enact the Americans with Disabilities Act

Y

 Benafsha Yaqoobi – commissioner at the Afghan Independent Human Rights Commission (AIHRC) until she fled Afghanistan with her husband in 2021
 Emmanuel Ofosu Yeboah – Ghanaian cyclist with one leg who rode across Ghana to raise awareness and works to increase the number of wheelchairs in his country
 Stella Young (1982–2014) – Australian journalist, comedian, and disability activist, used a wheelchair for most of her life, editor of the ABC online magazine Ramp Up

Z

 Frieda Zames – mathematics professor, writer and advocate for access to all aspects of public life, especially transportation; as an official of Disabled in Action, campaigned for wheelchair access on New York City buses, ferries and taxis and buildings like the Empire State Building; with her sister, Zames, wrote the book, The Disability Rights Movement: From Charity to Confrontation
 Maysoon Zayid – Palestinian actress, comedian, and disability rights activist known for her Ted Talk, "I've Got 99 Problems...Palsy is Just One"
 Hale Zukas – architectural and transportation barriers consultant, known for his pioneering work in Berkeley, California; lobbied for the creation and adoption of the Americans with Disabilities Act of 1990.

References

Disability-related lists

Lists of social activists